is a city tram station located on the Shinminatokō Line in Imizu, Toyama Prefecture, Japan. This station is unmanned.

Surrounding area
Nippon Koshuha Steel
Imizu Municipal Nago Junior High School

Railway stations in Toyama Prefecture